Bumper James Morris Pool (born James Morris Pool; September 28, 1999) is an American football linebacker for the Arkansas Razorbacks.

High school career 
Pool attended Lovejoy High School in Lucas, Texas. After a performance that included 19 tackles and three tackles for loss, Pool was named the Defensive player of the week by The Dallas Morning News. A four-star recruit, Pool had offers from Arkansas, Michigan, and Alabama. Pool committed to play college football at the University of Arkansas.

College career 
In Pool's first career game, as a freshman in 2018, he contributed with six tackles and a fumble return. In his freshman season, Pool played in ten games totaling 29 tackles. As a sophomore in 2019, Pool amassed 94 tackles including 6.5 tackles for loss. The following season, Pool was named to the Second team All-SEC. In a shortened ten-game season, Pool recorded 101 total tackles. He averaged 11.2 tackles per game finishing second in the SEC. In 2021, Pool once again was named to the Second team All-SEC, tallying 125 tackles. Pool decided to return for a fifth year at Arkansas, using the year of eligibility granted from the COVID-19 shortened season. Entering the season, Pool was named to the Butkus Award watch list. Pool was also named to the Phil Steele preseason First team All-SEC and Second team All-American teams. Pool was named the 39th best player in the upcoming college football season by ESPN. In his final season, Pool totaled 92 tackles, 4.5 tackles for loss, and two sacks, while being named to the Second team All-SEC for the third consecutive season. With 441 career tackles, Pool became the school's all-time leading tackler, surpassing Tony Bua's previous record of 408.

Personal life 
When Pool was 16, he legally changed his name to Bumper James Morris Pool. The name Bumper originated from his father's love for bumper pool as a child. 

Pool appeared in a question of a 2018 episode of Jeopardy!.

References

External links 
Arkansas Razorbacks bio

Arkansas Razorbacks football players
American football linebackers
1999 births
Living people
People from Collin County, Texas
Players of American football from Texas